The 1996–97 Macedonian First League was the 5th season of the Macedonian First Football League, the highest football league of Macedonia. The first matches of the season were played on 16 August 1996 and the last on 1 June 1997. Sileks defended their championship title, having won their second title in a row.

Promotion and relegation

Participating teams

League table

Results

Top goalscorers

Source: Top15goalscorers.blogspot.com

See also
1996–97 Macedonian Football Cup
1996–97 Macedonian Second Football League

References

External links
Macedonia - List of final tables (RSSSF)
Football Federation of Macedonia

Macedonia
1
Macedonian First Football League seasons